Henry Baird McLeish (born 15 June 1948) is a Scottish politician, author, academic and former footballer who served as First Minister of Scotland and Leader of the Labour Party in Scotland from 2000 to 2001. He was Member of Parliament (MP) for Central Fife from 1987 to 2001 and Member of the Scottish Parliament (MSP) for the equivalent seat from 1999 to 2003.

Born in Methil, Fife, McLeish was educated at Buckhaven High School before pursuing a career as a professional footballer. After suffering from an injury, he returned to education and studied at Heriot-Watt University. McLeish served on the Fife Regional Council and he made several attempts to seek election to the House of Commons. He was successful in the 1987 general election, representing the Central Fife and for ten years he sat in the Labour's opposition benches. Following the party's landslide victory in 1997, McLeish was appointed Minister of State for Scotland, working alongside Donald Dewar to establish the Scotland Act. When the Scottish Parliament was established in 1999, he contested and won the Central Fife constituency in that year's election. In May 1999, McLeish was appointed Minister for Enterprise and Lifelong Learning under the Dewar administration.

Following Dewar's death in October 2000, McLeish succeeded him as first minister. McLeish implemented the free personal care for the elderly scheme as well as the implementation of the McCrone Agreement for education teachers in Scotland. His tenure as first minister was short, as he resigned the following year following a financial scandal referred to as "Officegate"; the first major scandal the Scottish Parliament had faced since its reincarnation two years earlier. After standing down as first minister, he stood down from the Scottish Parliament at the 2003 election.

Since leaving office, McLeish has remained politically active and has written several books. In 2007, he was appointed to the Scottish Broadcasting Commission and the following year he chaired the Scottish Prisons Commission. In the 2014 Scottish independence referendum, he campaigned in favour of remaining in the UK. However, following the Brexit referendum, McLeish stated he would back another Scottish independence referendum if Scotland was taken out of the EU against its wishes.

Early life

Early years 
Henry Baird McLeish was born on 15 June 1948 in Methil, Fife, into a coal mining family. McLeish was educated at the Buckhaven High School. While a pupil at the school, he was "too concerned with football", having been told by his headmaster he had no future in education. In 1963, McLeish left school at the age of 15 to become a schoolboy professional football player. His rector wrote on his school report card: "I am glad the boy is a good footballer as he has no future in education."

He was first signed with Leeds United, however, after experiencing homesickness, he returned to Scotland to play for East Fife. He played wing-half and was one of the youngest ever players to play in Scottish professional football. His first game for East Fife was at Hampden Park against the Glasgow team, Queen’s Park. His footballing career was cut short by injury, and he returned to education.

Education 
McLeish returned to education following his injury, studying at Heriot-Watt University in Edinburgh from 1968–1973. He graduated with a BSc (Hons) in Town Planning. After graduating, McLeish worked as a research officer at Edinburgh Corporation's department of social work from 1973 to 1974, then as a planning officer for Fife County Council from 1974 to 1975 and Dunfermline District Council from 1975 to 1987. He also worked as a part-time lecturer and tutor at Heriot-Watt University from 1973 to 1986.

Early political career

Early career 
McLeish joined the Scottish Labour Party in 1970. He began his political career on the Kirkcaldy District Council from 1974 to 1977, serving as the council's planning committee chairman. He later served on the Fife Regional Council 1978 to 1987 and served as the as leader of Fife Regional Council from 1982. As the council leader, he implemented a "municipal socialist" manifesto, proposing free bus passes and TV licences for pensioners.

At the 1979 UK general election, he ran for the East Fife constituency for the British House of Commons. McLeish was unsuccessful, having been placed third, behind the Conservatives' Barry Henderson and the Liberals' Menzies Campbell. In 1981, he began to challenge Willie Hamilton in the Central Fife constituency. Hamilton was a right-wing Labour MP known nationally for his anti-monarchy views. He gave up his attempts to retain his candidacy, allowing McLeish to run in the 1987 election.

Labour in opposition; 1987-1997 
The Labour Party failed to defeat Margaret Thatcher's Conservative Party in the 1987 election and McLeish served in several shadow spokesman portfolios, including education and employment from 1988 to 1989 and employment and training from 1989 to 1992. Despite the end of Thatcher's eleven year tenure, Labour failed again to defeat the incumbent Conservatives, returning to opposition. McLeish served as shadow minister for the Scottish Office from 1992 to 1994.

In 1994, following Tony Blair's election as Leader of the Labour Party, McLeish served successively as the shadow minister for transport from 1994 to 1995, shadow minister for health from 1995 to 1996, and shadow minister for social security from 1996 to 1997.

1997 Scottish devolution referendum 
At the 1997 UK general election, McLeish served as Labour's election campaign director for Scotland. In the election, Labour defeated the Conservatives in a landslide victory. He was appointed by Blair as the Minister of State for Scotland, with responsibility for home affairs and devolution. McLeish worked alongside Donald Dewar on the Scotland Act 1998, which established the Scottish Parliament.

As Dewar's right-hand man in Westminster, McLeish helped secure devolution for Scotland and manoeuvre the Scotland Act through the Westminster Parliament.

Dewar administration; 1999-2000 
After the creation of the Scottish Parliament in May 1999, McLeish was elected as MSP for Fife Central and became Minister for Enterprise and Lifelong Learning.

On 11 October 2000, Dewar died of a brain haemorrhage following a fall outside Bute House the following day. Deputy First Minister Jim Wallace served as the acting First Minister, until the election of a new leader of Scottish Labour was held after Dewar's funeral. On 19 October, McLeish launched his bid to be the next leader of the Scottish Labour Party, with Jack McConnell later announcing his bid.

The ballot was held amongst a restricted electorate of Labour MSPs and members of Scottish Labour's national executive, because there was insufficient time for a full election to be held. McLeish defeated his rival Jack McConnell by 44 votes to 36 in the race to become the second first minister.

First Minister of Scotland 

McLeish won the Parliament's approval for the appointment of First Minister of Scotland on 26 October 2000. He was appointed by the Queen and sworn into office at the Court of Session in Edinburgh. The following day, he formed his administration, which was a continuation of the Labour-Liberal Democrat coalition.

September 11 attacks

McLeish was First Minister during the time of the September 11 attacks in the United States, and watched the events unfold in his office in St Andrews House, the HQ of the Scottish Government in Edinburgh. McLeish has spoken about his serious concern about the defence strategies in place within Scotland to protect the country from a terrorist attack of a similar nature. He initially worried about Scotland's major cities, such as Glasgow, Edinburgh and Aberdeen being targets based on their economic strength and significance to the Scottish, UK and European economies. In the immediate aftermath of the attacks, McLeish focussed on strengthening security, protection and defence systems in Scotland to ensure the country was equipped to deal with a large scale terrorist attack. McLeish lead the then Scottish Executive to working with the UK Government to ensure appropriate measures and strengthen security was in place within Scotland.

In the immediate aftermath of the attacks in the United States, McLeish instructed all airports in Scotland to be on alert and tighten their security measures.

On September 13, 2001, McLeish moved a motion in the Scottish Parliament to send condolences to the people of the United States and New York. Through the motion, McLeish said "the Parliament condemns the senseless and abhorrent acts of terrorism carried out in the United States yesterday and extends our deepest sympathies to those whose loved ones have been killed or injured".

As a Labour First Minister, and with a Labour UK Government in office at the time of the attacks under Tony Blair, McLeish initially supported the War on Terror, however stated in 2021 that he regrets that the war ultimately turned out as a "war on Islam".

Governmental record 

Professor John Curtice, a prominent political analyst, commented that McLeish would not have the "kind of authority" that Donald Dewar enjoyed. He travelled widely, particularly in the United States. He managed several task forces designed to improve the competitiveness of Scottish industry, especially the PILOT project for Scottish oil and gas supply chains.

He was embarrassed when an open microphone recorded him with Helen Liddell in a television studio, describing Scottish Secretary John Reid as "a patronising bastard" and said of his colleague, Brian Wilson, "Brian is supposed to be in charge of Africa but he spends most of his time in bloody Dublin. He is a liability".

Acts of Parliament
Whilst in government serving as first minister, McLeish oversaw and implemented the free personal care for the elderly scheme as well as the implementation of the McCrone Agreement for education teachers in Scotland.

Officegate and resignation

McLeish resigned as first minister in November 2001, amid a scandal involving allegations he sub-let part of his tax-subsidised Westminster constituency office without it having been registered in the register of interests kept in the Parliamentary office.

The press called the affair Officegate. Though McLeish could not have personally benefited financially from the oversight, he undertook to repay the £36,000 rental income, and resigned to allow Scottish Labour a clean break to prepare for the 2003 Scottish Parliament election. McLeish did not seek re-election.

Post-premiership 

Since leaving mainstream politics, McLeish has lectured widely in the United States, particularly at the United States Air Force Academy and the University of Arkansas, where he holds a visiting professorship shared between the Fulbright College of Arts and Sciences and the University of Arkansas School of Law. He is considered an expert on European-American relations and on the European Union.

In August 2007, he was appointed to the Scottish Broadcasting Commission, established by the Scottish Government. He also chaired the Scottish Prisons Commission, which produced a report into sentencing and the criminal justice system in 2008 entitled "Scotland's Choice". McLeish concluded a "major report" on the state of football in Scotland, which had been commissioned by the Scottish Football Association, in April 2010.

McLeish claimed that Scottish football was "underachieving, under performing and under funded" at a press conference to unveil the report.

Political views

Scottish devolution 
As a strong devolutionist, he was one of the original signatories of the claim of right at the inaugural meeting of the 1989 Scottish constitutional convention which paved the way for devolution.

Scottish nationalism 
In the run up to the referendum on Scottish independence on 18 September 2014, there was much media and public speculation towards whether McLeish backed a "No" vote to remain within the United Kingdom, or whether he supported a "Yes" vote in order to create an independent separate sovereign Scotland.

Speculation from the public came from media articles in which McLeish was reported to be talking negatively about the prospect of a "No" vote to remain within the union, but was later reported as stating it would be "near impossible" to vote Yes in the referendum.

Following the 2016 UK referendum on EU membership, in which the majority of the United Kingdom voted to leave the European Union, but the majority of the Scottish electorate voted to remain in the EU, McLeish has since claimed that he would support and campaign for an independent Scottish sovereign state and campaign for it to be a fully functioning member and participate fully within the European Union despite Brexit. In September 2021, he reiterated that he would support independence if the union was not reformed.

Titles and achievements

McLeish also holds the following positions and titles:

 Privy Counsellor
 Hartman Hotz Visiting Professor in Law and the Liberal Arts, jointly in the Fulbright College and Law School, University of Arkansas
 Visiting Professor at the Graduate School of International Studies at the University of Denver
 Visiting lecturer at the United States Air Force Academy, Colorado Springs, Colorado
 Honorary Fellow at the College of Humanities and Social Science at Edinburgh University
 Honorary Fellow at the Cambridge Land Institute, Fitzwilliam College, Cambridge University
 Adviser, Consultant and Facilitator to the European Foundation for the Improvement of Living and Working Conditions and the European Monitoring Centre for Change, Dublin, Republic of Ireland
 Adviser and Consultant to the LEED Programme of the OECD in Paris, France, including visits to Austria, Italy, and Mexico
 Consultant, in partnership with Jeremy Harrison, Cambridge (Public Value Partnership, working on new project development and evaluation of existing projects in the community and voluntary sector)

Authored books 

 Scotland First: Truth and Consequences (2004)
 Global Scots: Voices from Afar (with Kenny MacAskill) (2005) (published in the United Kingdom as Global Scots: Making It in the Modern World)
 Wherever the Saltire Flies (with Kenny MacAskill) (2006) 
 Scotland: The Road Divides (with Tom Brown) (2007)
 Scotland: A Suitable Case for Treatment (with Tom Brown) (2009)
 Scotland The Growing Divide: Old Nation, New Ideas (with Tom Brown) (2012)
 Rethinking our Politics: The political and constitutional future of Scotland and the UK (2014)
 Citizens United: Taking Back Control in Turbulent Times - Viewpoints (2017) 
 Scottish Football: Reviving the Beautiful Game (2018)
 People, Politics, Parliament: The Settled Will of the Scottish People (2022)

Electoral history

Scottish Parliament

UK Parliament

Notes

References

External links

|-

|-

|-

1948 births
Living people
People educated at Buckhaven High School
People from Methil
Academics of Heriot-Watt University
Fellows of Fitzwilliam College, Cambridge
Association football wing halves
Scottish Football League players
Scottish footballers
East Fife F.C. players
Leeds United F.C. players
Scottish biographers
Scottish political writers
Scottish public relations people
British sportsperson-politicians
First Ministers of Scotland
Scottish Labour MPs
Leaders of Scottish Labour
Members of the Privy Council of the United Kingdom
Members of the Scottish Parliament 1999–2003
Members of the Parliament of the United Kingdom for Fife constituencies
UK MPs 1987–1992
UK MPs 1992–1997
UK MPs 1997–2001
Labour MSPs
People from Kennoway
Scottish Junior Football Association players
Glenrothes F.C. players